The 1959–60 Scottish Division One was won by Heart of Midlothian by four points over nearest rival Kilmarnock. Stirling Albion and Arbroath finished 17th and 18th respectively and were relegated to the 1960-61 Second Division.

League table

Results

References

1
Scottish Division One seasons
Scot